Fernando Fiorillo de la Rosa (born 23 November 1956) is a former Colombian football player.

Career
Born in Soledad, Atlántico, Fiorillo played football for Atlético Junior during his professional career. Fiorillo made several appearances for the senior Colombia national football team, including participating at the 1983 Copa América.

He also played for Colombia at the 1980 Olympic Games in Moscow.

References

1956 births
Free University of Colombia alumni
Living people
Colombian footballers
Colombia international footballers
Footballers at the 1980 Summer Olympics
Olympic footballers of Colombia
1983 Copa América players
Categoría Primera A players
Atlético Junior footballers
Independiente Medellín footballers
Atlético Bucaramanga footballers
Association football midfielders
People from Atlántico Department